Camelia is a Romanian feminine given name. Notable persons with that name include:

Camelia (actress) (born 1919), Egyptian actress
Camelia Diaconescu (born 1963), Romanian rower
Camelia Frieberg (born 1959), Canadian film director and producer
Camelia Hotea (born 1984), Romanian handballer
Camelia Macoviciuc-Mihalcea (born 1968), Romanian rower
Camelia Potec (born 1982), Romanian swimmer
Camelia Voinea (born 1970), Romanian artistic gymnast
Camélia Jordana (born 1992), French Singer
Camelia Malik (born 1955), Indonesian Singer
Kamelia Petrova (born 2006), Bulgarian rhythmic gymnast 
Camelia Somers (born 1995), American Actress
Dayang Noor Camelia Abang Khalid (born 1974), known by her stage name Camelia, Malaysian Singer

Feminine given names
Romanian feminine given names